Liophloeus tessulatus is a species of beetle belonging to the family Curculionidae.

It is native to Europe.

References

Curculionidae
Beetles described in 1776